Dresden is a village in Yates County, New York, United States. The population was 308 at the 2010 census. The village was named after Dresden in Germany.

The Village of Dresden is located in the Town of Torrey and is twelve miles south of Geneva.  Dresden is located in the Finger Lakes Region of New York.

History 

The region was known as "Kashong" (or "Kashanquash") to the natives and was part of the Phelps and Gorham Purchase.

At the end of the 18th century, followers of the Public Universal Friend, a religious leader, began to settle in the area. They called the area "Jerusalem" and founded a community near the present site of Dresden.

Dresden was founded in 1811 as a planned community. The Village of Dresden was incorporated in 1867.

Dresden was the eastern terminus for the former Crooked Lake Canal, which operated from 1833 to 1877. This canal linked the area through other lake canals to the Erie Canal.

The Robert Ingersoll Birthplace and Christopher Willis House are listed on the National Register of Historic Places.

Notable people
Frederick Condit, Wisconsin legislator
Robert G. Ingersoll, political leader and orator, born in Dresden

Geography

Dresden is located at  (42.683857, -76.957296).

The village on the west shore of Seneca Lake. Keuka Lake Outlet (known early as "Crooked Lake Outlet"), a stream connecting Keuka Lake with Seneca Lake, flows past the south side of the village.  At first the significant water drop made it an important location for mills. Later it was developed as a canal between the lakes.

New York State Route 14 intersects New York State Route 54 at Dresden.

Demographics

As of the census of 2000, there were 307 people, 116 households, and 78 families residing in the village. The population density was 1,005.1 people per square mile (382.4/km2). There were 139 housing units at an average density of 455.1 per square mile (173.1/km2). The racial makeup of the village was 94.14% White, 0.33% Native American, 0.33% Asian, 5.21% from other races. Hispanic or Latino of any race were 9.77% of the population.

There were 116 households, out of which 28.4% had children under the age of 18 living with them, 56.0% were married couples living together, 5.2% had a female householder with no husband present, and 31.9% were non-families. 23.3% of all households were made up of individuals, and 12.1% had someone living alone who was 65 years of age or older. The average household size was 2.58 and the average family size was 2.92.

In the village, the population was spread out, with 21.5% under the age of 18, 8.5% from 18 to 24, 22.8% from 25 to 44, 30.9% from 45 to 64, and 16.3% who were 65 years of age or older. The median age was 43 years. For every 100 females, there were 106.0 males. For every 100 females age 18 and over, there were 99.2 males.

The median income for a household in the village was $42,500, and the median income for a family was $40,208. Males had a median income of $31,875 versus $24,375 for females. The per capita income for the village was $18,207.  About 4.8% of families and 5.7% of the population were below the poverty line, including 13.0% of those under the age of eighteen and none of those 65 or over.

Additional information about Dresden 
 The local history museum is the Robert Ingersoll Birthplace.
 The Outlet Trail is used for hiking and kayaking, following the former canal and ruins of mills.
 Many wineries are within a short distance of the village.
 A natural gas energy plant owned by Greenidge Generation generates electrical power and performs crypto currency mining (58%) and takes water for cooling from the lake.
 The NUWC Seneca Lake Sonar Test Facility is located in Dresden and operates an offshore platform in the middle of the lake.

Gallery

References

External links

 Village of Dresden, NY
  Outlet Trail information

1867 establishments in New York (state)
Populated places established in 1867
Villages in Yates County, New York
Villages in New York (state)